Matthew Stutzman (born December 10, 1982) is an American archer. He competed at the 2012 and 2016 Paralympics and won a silver medal in 2012.  Born without arms, Stutzman uses his legs and feet for most of his activities, including archery. He holds a world record for the longest accurate shot in the sport.

Stutzman was born in Kansas City, Kansas, and currently lives in Fairfield, Iowa. He is married with two sons, and appeared in the 2013 documentary film My Way to Olympia.

He won the gold medal in his event at the 2022 World Para Archery Championships held in Dubai, United Arab Emirates.

References

References

 
 

1982 births
Living people
American male archers
Sportspeople from Iowa
Sportspeople from Kansas City, Kansas
Archers at the 2012 Summer Paralympics
Archers at the 2016 Summer Paralympics
Paralympic archers of the United States
Amputee category Paralympic competitors
Medalists at the 2012 Summer Paralympics
Paralympic silver medalists for the United States
People from Fairfield, Iowa
Paralympic medalists in archery
Medalists at the 2015 Parapan American Games
21st-century American people
Ripley's Believe It or Not!
People without hands